Jens Hakon Johannes Andersen (26 October 1875 – 21 April 1959) was a Danish organist and composer.  He served as organist for a number of churches around Copenhagen throughout his career.

Danish composers
Male composers
Danish classical organists
Male classical organists
1875 births
1959 deaths